The 70th Primetime Creative Arts Emmy Awards honored the best in artistic and technical achievement in American prime time television programming from June 1, 2017, until May 31, 2018, as chosen by the Academy of Television Arts & Sciences. The awards were presented across two ceremonies on September 8 and September 9, 2018. The nominations were announced on July 12, 2018. The ceremony was in conjunction with the annual Primetime Emmy Awards and is presented in recognition of technical and other similar achievements in American television programming, including guest acting roles.

Winners and nominees

Governors Award
 Star Trek (presented to CBS Television Studios)

Programs
{| class="wikitable"
|+ 
|-
| style="vertical-align:top;" width="50%" | 
 Queer Eye (Netflix) Antiques Roadshow (PBS)
 Fixer Upper (HGTV)
 Lip Sync Battle (Paramount Network)
 Shark Tank (ABC)
 Who Do You Think You Are? (TLC)
| style="vertical-align:top;" width="50%" | 
 United Shades of America (CNN) Born This Way (A&E)
 Deadliest Catch (Discovery Channel)
 Intervention (A&E)
 Naked and Afraid (Discovery Channel)
 RuPaul's Drag Race: Untucked (VH1)
|-
| style="vertical-align:top;" width="50%" | 
 "USS Callister" (Black Mirror) (Netflix) Fahrenheit 451 (HBO)
 Flint (Lifetime)
 Paterno (HBO)
 The Tale (HBO)
| style="vertical-align:top;" width="50%" | 
 Dave Chappelle: Equanimity  (Netflix) The Carol Burnett Show: 50th Anniversary Special (CBS)
 Carpool Karaoke Primetime Special 2018 (CBS)
 Full Frontal with Samantha Bee Presents the Great American* Puerto Rico (*It's complicated.) (TBS)
 Steve Martin and Martin Short: An Evening You Will Forget for the Rest of Your Life (Netflix)
|-
| style="vertical-align:top;" width="50%" | 
 Anthony Bourdain: Parts Unknown (CNN) Leah Remini: Scientology and the Aftermath (A&E)
 My Next Guest Needs No Introduction with David Letterman (Netflix)
 StarTalk with Neil deGrasse Tyson (Nat Geo)
 Vice (HBO)
| style="vertical-align:top;" width="50%" | 
 Wild Wild Country (Netflix) American Masters (PBS)
 Blue Planet II (BBC America)
 The Defiant Ones (HBO)
 The Fourth Estate (Showtime)
|-
| style="vertical-align:top;" width="50%" | 
 The Zen Diaries of Garry Shandling (HBO) Icarus (Netflix)
 Jim & Andy: The Great Beyond (Netflix)
 Mister Rogers: It's You I Like (PBS)
 Spielberg (HBO)
| style="vertical-align:top;" width="50%" | 
 Rick and Morty: "Pickle Rick" (Adult Swim) Big Hero 6: The Series: "Baymax Returns" (Disney XD)
 Bob's Burgers: "V for Valentine-detta" (Fox)
 The Simpsons: "Gone Boy" (Fox)
 South Park: "Put It Down" (Comedy Central)
|-
| style="vertical-align:top;" width="50%" | 
 Robot Chicken: "Freshly Baked: The Robot Chicken Santa Claus Pot Cookie Freakout Special: Special Edition" (Adult Swim) Adventure Time: "Ring of Fire" (Cartoon Network)
 Steven Universe: "Jungle Moon" (Cartoon Network)
 Teen Titans Go!: "The Self-Indulgent 200th Episode Spectacular! Pt. 1 and Pt. 2" (Cartoon Network)
 We Bare Bears: "Hurricane Hal" (Cartoon Network)
| style="vertical-align:top;" width="50%" | 
 The Magical Wand Chase: A Sesame Street Special (HBO) Alexa & Katie (Netflix)
 Fuller House (Netflix)
 A Series of Unfortunate Events (Netflix)
 Star Wars Rebels (Disney XD)
|-
| style="vertical-align:top;" width="50%" | 
 Jesus Christ Superstar Live in Concert (NBC) 75th Golden Globe Awards (NBC)
 60th Annual Grammy Awards (CBS) 
 Night of Too Many Stars: America Unites for Autism Programs (HBO)
 The Oscars (ABC)
| style="vertical-align:top;" width="50%" | 
 Anthony Bourdain: Explore Parts Unknown (CNN.com) The Americans: The Final Season (FX)
 The Assassination of Gianni Versace: American Crime Story: America's Obsessions (FX)
 Jay Leno's Garage (NBC.com)
 Top Chef: Last Chance Kitchen (bravotv.com)
|-
| style="vertical-align:top;" width="50%" | 
 Strong Island (Netflix) City of Ghosts (A&E)
 Jane (Nat Geo)
 What Haunts Us (Starz)
| style="vertical-align:top;" width="50%" | 
 James Corden's Next James Corden  (CBS on Snapchat) aka Wyatt Cenac (TOPIC.com)
 An Emmy for Megan (anemmyformegan.com)
 Grey's Anatomy: B Team (abc.go.com)
 The Walking Dead: Red Machete (AMC.com)
|-
| style="vertical-align:top;" width="50%" colspan="2" | 
 Carpool Karaoke: The Series (Apple Music) Creating Saturday Night Live (nbc.com)
 The Daily Show — Between the Scenes (thedailyshow.com)
 Gay of Thrones (FunnyOrDie)
 Honest Trailers (YouTube)
 The Tonight Show Starring Jimmy Fallon - Cover Room (nbc.com)
|}

Acting

Animation

Casting
{| class="wikitable"
|+ 
|-
| style="vertical-align:top;" width="50%" | 
 The Marvelous Mrs. Maisel (Prime Video) Atlanta (FX)
 Barry (HBO)
 GLOW (Netflix)
 Silicon Valley (HBO)
| style="vertical-align:top;" width="50%" | 
 The Crown (Netflix) Game of Thrones (HBO)
 The Handmaid's Tale (Hulu)
 Stranger Things (Netflix)
 Westworld (HBO)
|-
| style="vertical-align:top;" width="50%" | 
 The Assassination of Gianni Versace: American Crime Story (FX) Godless (Netflix)
 Jesus Christ Superstar Live in Concert (NBC)
 The Looming Tower (Hulu)
 Patrick Melrose (Showtime)
| style="vertical-align:top;" width="50%" | 
 Queer Eye (Netflix) Born This Way (A&E)
 Project Runway (Lifetime)
 RuPaul's Drag Race (VH1)
 The Voice (NBC)
|}

Choreography
{| class="wikitable"
|+ 
|-
| style="vertical-align:top;" | 
 So You Think You Can Dance: "Brand New" / "To Make You Feel My Love" – Mandy Moore (Fox) The Late Late Show with James Corden: "The Greatest Showman" / "Crosswalk the Musical on Broadway" – Chloe Arnold (CBS)
 So You Think You Can Dance: "Change Is Everything" / "Strange Fruit" – Travis Wall (Fox)
 So You Think You Can Dance: "The Man That Got Away" / "L-O-V-E" – Al Blackstone (Fox)
 So You Think You Can Dance: "Prism" / "Say You Won't Let Go" – Christopher Scott (Fox)
|}

Cinematography
{| class="wikitable"
|+ 
|-
| style="vertical-align:top;" width="50%" | 
 Will & Grace: "A Gaye Olde Christmas" – Gary Baum (NBC) The Ranch: "Do What You Gotta Do" – Donald A. Morgan (Netflix)
 Superior Donuts: "Grades of Wrath" – Paty Lee (CBS)
| style="vertical-align:top;" width="50%" | 
 Atlanta: "Teddy Perkins" – Christian Sprenger (FX) Barry: "Chapter Eight: Know Your Truth" – Paula Huidobro (HBO)
 The End of the F***ing World: "Episode 3" – Justin Brown (Netflix)
 GLOW: "Pilot" – Christian Sprenger (Netflix)
 Insecure: "Hella LA" – Patrick Cady (HBO)
 Mozart in the Jungle: "Ichi Go Ichi E" – Tobias Datum (Prime Video)
|-
| style="vertical-align:top;" width="50%" | 
 Genius: Picasso: "Chapter One" – Mathias Herndl (Nat Geo) The Alienist: "The Boy on the Bridge" – PJ Dillon (TNT)
 Black Mirror: "USS Callister" – Stephan Pehrsson (Netflix)
 Fahrenheit 451 – Kramer Morgenthau (HBO)
 Godless: "An Incident at Creede" – Steven Meizler (Netflix)
 Twin Peaks: "Part 8" – Peter Deming (Showtime)
| style="vertical-align:top;" width="50%" | 
 The Crown: "Beryl" – Adriano Goldman (Netflix) The Handmaid's Tale: "June" – Colin Watkinson (Hulu)
 Legion: "Chapter 8" – Dana Gonzales (FX)
 The Marvelous Mrs. Maisel: "Pilot" – M. David Mullen (Prime Video)
 Ozark: "The Toll" – Ben Kutchins (Netflix)
 Stranger Things: "Chapter One: MADMAX" – Tim Ives (Netflix)
 Westworld: "The Riddle of the Sphinx" – John Grillo (HBO)
|-
| style="vertical-align:top;" width="50%" | 
 Life Below Zero (Nat Geo) The Amazing Race: "It's Just a Million Dollars, No Pressure" (CBS)
 Born This Way: "Homecoming" (A&E)
 Deadliest Catch: "Battle Lines" (Discovery Channel)
 Queer Eye: "To Gay or Not Too Gay" (Netflix)
 RuPaul's Drag Race: "10s Across the Board" (VH1)
| style="vertical-align:top;" width="50%" | 
 Jane – Ellen Kuras and Hugo van Lawick (Nat Geo) Anthony Bourdain: Parts Unknown: "Lagos" – Morgan Fallon, Jerry Risius and Tarik Hameedi (CNN)
 Blue Planet II: "The Deep" – Gavin Thurston (BBC America)
 Blue Planet II: "One Ocean" – Ted Giffords and Roger Munns (BBC America)
 Chef's Table: "Corrado Assenza" – Adam Bricker (Netflix)
|}

Commercial

Costumes
{| class="wikitable"
|+ 
|-
| style="vertical-align:top;" width="50%" | 
 The Crown: "Dear Mrs. Kennedy" (Netflix) The Alienist: "A Fruitful Partnership" (TNT)
 Genius: Picasso: "Chapter One" (Nat Geo)
 The Marvelous Mrs. Maisel: "The Disappointment of the Dionne Quintuplets" (Prime Video)
 Outlander: "Freedom & Whisky" (Starz)
| style="vertical-align:top;" width="50%" | 
 Game of Thrones: "Beyond the Wall" (HBO) Fahrenheit 451 (HBO)
 The Handmaid's Tale: "Seeds" (Hulu)
 A Series of Unfortunate Events: "The Vile Village: Part 1" (Netflix)
 Westworld: "Akane no Mai" (HBO)
|-
| style="vertical-align:top;" width="50%" | 
 The Assassination of Gianni Versace: American Crime Story: "The Man Who Would Be Vogue" (FX) Black-ish: "Juneteenth" (ABC)
 Empire: "Slave to Memory" (Fox)
 Grace and Frankie: "The Expiration Date" (Netflix)
 This Is Us: "The Wedding" (NBC)
| style="vertical-align:top;" width="50%" | 
 RuPaul's Drag Race: "10s Across the Board" (VH1) Dancing with the Stars: "Disney Night" (ABC)
 Jesus Christ Superstar Live in Concert (NBC)
 Saturday Night Live: "Host: Natalie Portman" (NBC)
 Tracey Ullman's Show: "Episode 1" (HBO)
|}

Directing

Hairstyling
{| class="wikitable"
|+ 
|-
| style="vertical-align:top;" width="50%" | 
 Westworld: "Akane no Mai" (HBO) The Crown: "Dear Mrs. Kennedy" (Netflix)
 Game of Thrones: "The Dragon and the Wolf" (HBO)
 GLOW: "Pilot" (Netflix)
 The Marvelous Mrs. Maisel: "Pilot" (Prime Video)
| style="vertical-align:top;" width="50%" | 
 RuPaul's Drag Race: "10s Across the Board" (VH1) Dancing with the Stars: "Night at the Movies" (ABC)
 Jesus Christ Superstar Live in Concert (NBC)
 Saturday Night Live: "Host: Tiffany Haddish" (NBC)
 The Voice: "Live Finale, Part 1" (NBC)
|-
| style="vertical-align:top;" width="50%" colspan="2" | 
 The Assassination of Gianni Versace: American Crime Story (FX)'''
 American Horror Story: Cult (FX)
 Genius: Picasso (Nat Geo)
 Godless (Netflix)
 The Last Tycoon: "Oscar, Oscar, Oscar" (Prime Video)
 Twin Peaks (Showtime)
|}

Hosting

Interactive Media
{| class="wikitable"
|+ 
|-
| style="vertical-align:top;" width="50%" | 
 NASA JPL: Cassini's Grand Finale  (YouTube) Back to the Moon (Google)
 Blade Runner 2049: Memory Lab (Oculus)
 Coco VR (Oculus)
 Spider-Man Homecoming VR Experience (PlayStation VR App)
| style="vertical-align:top;" width="50%" | 
 Last Week Tonight with John Oliver (HBO) The Daily Show (Comedy Central)
 Full Frontal with Samantha Bee Online (TBS)
 The Late Late Show with James Corden (CBS)
 Saturday Night Live (NBC)
|-
| style="vertical-align:top;" width="50%" | 
 Westworld – Chaos Takes Control Interactive Experience (HBO) Mr. Robot – Ecoin (USA)
 Rick and Morty – Virtual Rick-ality (Adult Swim)
 Silicon Valley – Interactive World: Not Hotdog, VR & Twitter-Powered Pizza Drones  (HBO)
 13 Reasons Why – Talk to the Reasons (Netflix)
| style="vertical-align:top;" width="50%" | 
 CONAN without Borders (TBS) The Oscars: All Access (Oscars.com)
 RuPaul's Drag Race – Season 10 RuVeal  (VH1)
 Watch What Happens Live with Andy Cohen (Bravo)
|}

Lighting Design / Direction
{| class="wikitable"
|+ 
|-
| style="vertical-align:top;" width="50%" | 
 Saturday Night Live: "Host: Kevin Hart" (NBC) America's Got Talent: "The Finals" (NBC)
 Dancing with the Stars: "Halloween Night" (ABC)
 So You Think You Can Dance: "Finale" (Fox)
 The Voice: "Live Finale (Part 1)" (NBC)
| style="vertical-align:top;" width="50%" | 
 Jesus Christ Superstar Live in Concert (NBC) 60th Grammy Awards (CBS)
 The Oscars (ABC)
 Super Bowl LII Halftime Show Starring Justin Timberlake (NBC)
 71st Annual Tony Awards (CBS)
|}

Main Title Design
{| class="wikitable"
|+ 
|-
| style="vertical-align:top;" | 
 Counterpart (Starz) The Alienist (TNT)
 Altered Carbon (Netflix)
 GLOW (Netflix)
 Westworld (HBO)
|}

Make-up
{| class="wikitable"
|+ 
|-
| style="vertical-align:top;" width="50%" | 
 Westworld: "Akane no Mai" (HBO) Game of Thrones: "The Dragon and the Wolf" (HBO)
 GLOW: "Money's on the Chase" (Netflix)
 The Handmaid's Tale: "Unwomen" (Hulu)
 This Is Us: "Number Three" (NBC)
 Vikings: "Homeland" (History)
| style="vertical-align:top;" width="50%" | 
 Saturday Night Live: "Host: Tina Fey" (NBC) Dancing with the Stars: "Halloween Night" (ABC)
 Jesus Christ Superstar Live in Concert (NBC)
 RuPaul's Drag Race: "10s Across the Board" (VH1)
 The Voice: "Live Finale, Part 1" (NBC)
|-
| style="vertical-align:top;" width="50%" | 
 The Assassination of Gianni Versace: American Crime Story (FX) American Horror Story: Cult (FX)
 Genius: Picasso (Nat Geo)
 The Last Tycoon: "Oscar, Oscar, Oscar" (Prime Video)
 Twin Peaks (Showtime)
| style="vertical-align:top;" width="50%" | 
 Game of Thrones: "The Dragon and the Wolf" (HBO)' American Horror Story: Cult (FX)
 The Assassination of Gianni Versace: American Crime Story (FX)
 Star Trek: Discovery: "Will You Take My Hand?" (CBS)
 Westworld: "The Riddle of the Sphinx" (HBO)
|}

Motion Design
{| class="wikitable"
|+ 
|-
| style="vertical-align:top;" | 
 'Broad City: "Mushrooms" – Mike Perry, Isam Prado, Eric Perez, Maya Edelman, and Barbara Benas (Comedy Central) Wasted! The Story of Food Waste – Mike Houston, Daniel de Graaf, Naoko Saito, Ryan Frost, and Chris King (Starz)'|}

Music
{| class="wikitable"
|+ 
|-
| style="vertical-align:top;" width="50%" | 
 Game of Thrones: "The Dragon and the Wolf" – Ramin Djawadi (HBO) Marvel's Jessica Jones: "AKA Playland" – Sean Callery (Netflix)
 Once Upon a Time: "Leaving Storybrooke" – Mark Isham, Cindy O'Connor, and Michael Simon (ABC)
 SEAL Team: "Pattern of Life" – W.G. Snuffy Walden and A. Patrick Rose (CBS)
 Star Wars Rebels: "Family Reunion – and Farewell" – Kevin Kiner (Disney XD)
 Westworld: "Akane no Mai" – Ramin Djawadi (HBO)
| style="vertical-align:top;" width="50%" | 
 March of the Penguins 2: The Next Step – Cyril Aufort (Hulu) Alias Grace: "Part 1" – Mychael Danna and Jeff Danna (Netflix)
 Black Mirror: "USS Callister" –  Daniel Pemberton (Netflix)
 Godless: "Homecoming" – Carlos Rafael Rivera (Netflix)
 Philip K. Dick's Electric Dreams: "The Commuter" – Harry Gregson-Williams (Prime Video)
 Philip K. Dick's Electric Dreams: "Crazy Diamond" – Cristobal Tapia de Veer (Prime Video)
|-
| style="vertical-align:top;" width="50%" | 
 Tony Bennett: The Library of Congress Gershwin Prize for Popular Song (PBS) Bruno Mars: 24K Magic Live at the Apollo (CBS)
 Elton John: I'm Still Standing – A Grammy Salute (CBS)
 The Oscars (ABC)
 Super Bowl LII Halftime Show Starring Justin Timberlake (NBC)
| style="vertical-align:top;" width="50%" | 
 Saturday Night Live: "Host: Chance the Rapper" – "Come Back Barack" (NBC) Big Mouth: "Am I Gay?" – "Totally Gay" (Netflix)
 A Christmas Story Live! – "In the Market for a Miracle" (Fox)
 The Good Fight: "Day 450" – "High Crimes and Misdemeanors" (CBS)
 If You're Not in the Obit, Eat Breakfast – "Just Getting Started" (HBO)
 Steve Martin and Martin Short: An Evening You Will Forget for the Rest of Your Life – "The Buddy Song" (Netflix)
|-
| style="vertical-align:top;" width="50%" | 
 Godless – Carlos Rafael Rivera (Netflix) The Last Tycoon – Mychael Danna (Prime Video)
 Marvel's The Defenders – John Paesano (Netflix)
 The Putin Interviews – Jeff Beal (Showtime)
 Somebody Feed Phil – Mike S. Olson, Bridget Ellen Kearney, Michael Calabrese, and Rachael Price (Netflix)
 The Tick – Chris Bacon (Prime Video)
| style="vertical-align:top;" width="50%" | 
 The Marvelous Mrs. Maisel: "Pilot" – Robin Urdang, Daniel Palladino, and Amy Sherman-Palladino (Prime Video)'''
 Atlanta: "Alligator Man" – Jen Malone and Fam Udeorji (FX)
 Stranger Things: "Trick or Treat, Freak" – Nora Felder (Netflix)
 This Is Us: "That'll Be the Day" – Jennifer Pyken (NBC)
 Westworld: "Akane no Mai" – Sean O'Meara (HBO)
|}

Picture Editing
{| class="wikitable"
|+ 
|-
| style="vertical-align:top;" width="50%" | 
 'The Handmaid's Tale: "June" – Wendy Hallam Martin (Hulu) Game of Thrones: "Beyond the Wall" – Tim Porter (HBO)
 Game of Thrones: "The Dragon and the Wolf" – Crispin Green (HBO)
 Game of Thrones: "The Spoils of War" – Katie Weiland (HBO)
 Stranger Things: "Chapter Nine: The Gate" – Kevin D. Ross (Netflix)
| style="vertical-align:top;" width="50%" | 
 The Marvelous Mrs. Maisel: "Pilot" – Brian A. Kates (Prime Video) Atlanta: "Alligator Man" – Isaac Hagy (FX)
 Atlanta: "Teddy Perkins" – Kyle Reiter (FX)
 Barry: "Chapter Eight: Know Your Truth" – Kyle Reiter (HBO)
 Barry: "Chapter Seven: Loud, Fast, and Keep Going" – Jeff Buchanan (HBO)
|-
| style="vertical-align:top;" width="50%" | 
 Black Mirror: "USS Callister" – Selina MacArthur (Netflix) The Assassination of Gianni Versace: American Crime Story: "Alone" – Emily Greene (FX)
 The Assassination of Gianni Versace: American Crime Story: "House by the Lake" – Shelly Westerman (FX)
 The Assassination of Gianni Versace: American Crime Story: "Manhunt" – Chi-Yoon Chung (FX)
 Twin Peaks: "Part 8" – Duwayne Dunham, Brian Berdan, Jonathan P. Shaw, Justin Krohn, Jason W. A. Tucker, and David Lynch (Showtime)
| style="vertical-align:top;" width="50%" | 
 Will & Grace: "Grandpa Jack" – Peter Beyt (NBC) The Big Bang Theory: "The Bow Tie Asymmetry" – Peter Chakos (CBS)
 Mom: "Crazy Snakes and a Clog to the Head" – Joe Bella (CBS)
 One Day at a Time: "Not Yet" – Pat Barnett (Netflix)
 Roseanne: "Darlene v. David" – Brian Schnuckel (ABC)
|-
| style="vertical-align:top;" width="50%" | 
 Last Week Tonight with John Oliver: "Border Patrol" – Ryan Barger (HBO) Dave Chappelle: Equanimity – Jeff U'ren (Netflix)
 Drunk History: "Heroines" – John Cason (Comedy Central)
 Full Frontal with Samantha Bee Presents: The Great American* Puerto Rico (*It's Complicated) – Jesse Coane, Charles Divak, Daphne Gomez-Mena, Andrew Mendelson, Tennille Uithof, and Ryan Barger (TBS)
 Last Week Tonight with John Oliver: "Wax President Harding" – Anthony Miale (HBO)
 Carpool Karaoke Primetime Special 2018 – Brad Conlin and Tom Jarvis (CBS)
| style="vertical-align:top;" width="50%" | 
 Anthony Bourdain: Parts Unknown: "Lagos" – Hunter Gross (CNN) The Defiant Ones – Lasse Järvi and Doug Pray (HBO)
 Jane – Joe Beshenkovsky, Will Znidaricand, and Brett Morgen (Nat Geo)
 Wild Wild Country: "Part 3" – Neil Meiklejohn (Netflix)
 The Zen Diaries of Garry Shandling – Joe Beshenkovsky (HBO)
|-
| style="vertical-align:top;" width="50%" | 
 Queer Eye – Thomas Scott Reuther, Joe DeShano, A.M. Peters, Ryan Taylor, Matthew D. Miller and Brian Ray (Netflix) The Amazing Race: "It's Just a Million Dollars, No Pressure" – Brooks Larson, Jay Gammill, Josh Lowry, Michael Bolanowski, Tori Rodman, Jason Pedroza, Eric Beetner, and Tricia Rodrigo (CBS)
 American Ninja Warrior: "Daytona Beach Qualifiers" – Nick Gagnon, David Green, Michael Kalbron, Corey Ziemniak, Curtis Pierce, Kyle Barr, and Mary Dechambres (NBC)
 RuPaul's Drag Race: "10s Across the Board" – Jamie Martin, John Lim, Drew Forni, and Michael Roha (VH1)
 The Voice – John M. Larson, Robert Michael Malachowski, Jr, Hudson H. Smith III, Matt Antell, Roger Bartlett, Sean Basaman, Kevin Benson, Matthew Blair, Melissa Silva Borden, William Fabian Castro, Grady Cooper, A.J. Dickerson, Glen Ebesu, Noel A. Guerra, John Homesley, Omega Hsu, Ryan P. James, Charles A. Kramer, James J. Munoz, Rich Remis, David I. Sowell, Robby Thompson, and Eric Wise (NBC)
| style="vertical-align:top;" width="50%" | 
 United Shades of America: "Sikhs in America" – Bryan Eber (CNN)' Born This Way – Jarrod Burt, Jacob Lane, Mac Caudill, Madison Pathe, John Barley, Daysha Broadway, Stephanie Lyra, Svein Mikkelsen, Ryan Rambach, Peggy Tachdjian, and Dan Zimmerman (A&E)
 Deadliest Catch: "Battle Lines" – Rob Butler, Alexandra Moore, Ben Bulatao, Josh Earl, and Greg Cornejo (Discovery Channel)
 Life Below Zero: "The 11th Hour" – Eric Michael Schrader, Tony Diaz, Matt Mercer, and Jennifer Nelson (Nat Geo)
 RuPaul's Drag Race: Untucked: "Untucked" / "10s Across the Board" – Lousine Shamamian (VH1)
|}

Production Design
{| class="wikitable"
|+ 
|-
| style="vertical-align:top;" width="50%" | 
 The Handmaid's Tale: "June" (Hulu) American Horror Story: Cult (FX)
 The Handmaid's Tale: "Seeds" / "After" / "First Blood" (Hulu)
 Ozark: "My Dripping Sleep" (Netflix)
 Twin Peaks (Showtime)
| style="vertical-align:top;" width="50%" | 
 Game of Thrones: "Dragonstone" (HBO) The Alienist: "The Boy on the Bridge" (TNT)
 The Crown: "Beryl" (Netflix)
 The Marvelous Mrs. Maisel: "Ya Shivu v Bolshom Dome Na Kholme" (Prime Video)
 Westworld: "Akane no Mai" (HBO)
|-
| style="vertical-align:top;" width="50%" | 
 GLOW: "The Dusty Spur" (Netflix) Atlanta: "Teddy Perkins" (FX)
 Barry: "Chapter Seven: Loud, Fast, and Keep Going" (HBO)
 Grace and Frankie: "The Tappys" / "The Landline" / "The Home" (Netflix)
 Silicon Valley: "Tech Evangelist" / "Artificial Emotional Intelligence" (HBO)
 Will & Grace: "A Gay Olde Christmas" (NBC)
| style="vertical-align:top;" width="50%" | 
 Saturday Night Live: "Host: Bill Hader" (NBC) Bill Nye Saves The World: "Extinction: Why All Our Friends Are Dying" (Netflix)
 Dancing with the Stars: "Night at the Movies" / "Halloween Night" / "Season Finale" (ABC)
 Last Week Tonight with John Oliver: "Episode 418" (HBO)
 The Voice: "The Blind Auditions Season Premiere" (NBC)
|-
| style="vertical-align:top;" width="50%" colspan="2" | 
 Jesus Christ Superstar Live in Concert (NBC)'''
 The Carol Burnett Show: 50th Anniversary Special (CBS)
 75th Annual Golden Globe Awards (NBC)
 60th Annual Grammy Awards (CBS)
 The Oscars (ABC)
|}

Sound
{| class="wikitable"
|+ 
|-
| style="vertical-align:top;" width="50%" | 
 Stranger Things: "Chapter Eight: The Mind Flayer" (Netflix) Game of Thrones: "The Spoils of War" (HBO)
 Homeland: "All In" (Showtime)
 Star Trek: Discovery: "What's Past Is Prologue" (CBS All Access)
 Westworld: "Akane no Mai" (HBO)
| style="vertical-align:top;" width="50%" | 
 Atlanta: "Teddy Perkins" (FX) Ballers: "Bull Rush" (HBO)
 Barry: "Chapter Seven: Loud, Fast, and Keep Going" (HBO)
 Star Wars Rebels: "A World Between Worlds" (Disney XD)
 Vice Principals: "The Union of the Wizard & the Warrior" (HBO)
|-
| style="vertical-align:top;" width="50%" | 
 Black Mirror: "USS Callister" (Netflix) American Horror Story: Cult: "Great Again" (FX)
 Fahrenheit 451 (HBO)
 Godless: "Homecoming" (Netflix)
 Twin Peaks: "Part 8" (Showtime)
 Waco: "Operation Showtime" (Paramount Network)
| style="vertical-align:top;" width="50%" | 
 Anthony Bourdain: Parts Unknown: "Seattle" (CNN) Blue Planet II: "Coral Reefs" (BBC America)
 The Defiant Ones: "Episode 1" (HBO)
 Jane (Nat Geo)
 The Vietnam War: "Episode 6: Things Fall Apart (January 1968–July 1968)" (PBS)
 Wild Wild Country: "Part 1" (Netflix)
|-
| style="vertical-align:top;" width="50%" | 
 Game of Thrones: "Beyond the Wall" (HBO) The Handmaid's Tale: "June" (Hulu)
 Mr. Robot: "eps3.4_runtime-error.r00" (USA)
 Stranger Things: "Chapter Eight: The Mind Flayer" (Netflix)
 Westworld: "Akane no Mai" (HBO)
| style="vertical-align:top;" width="50%" | 
 Genius: "Picasso: Chapter One" (Nat Geo) The Assassination of Gianni Versace: American Crime Story: "The Man Who Would Be Vogue" (FX)
 Fahrenheit 451 (HBO)
 Twin Peaks: "Part 8" (Showtime)
 Waco: "Operation Showtime" (Paramount Network)
|-
| style="vertical-align:top;" width="50%" | 
 Barry: "Chapter Seven: Loud, Fast, and Keep Going" (HBO) Family Guy: "Three Directors" (Fox)
 Modern Family: "Lake Life" (ABC)
 Mozart in the Jungle: "Domo Arigato" (Prime Video)
 Silicon Valley: "Fifty-One Percent" (HBO)
| style="vertical-align:top;" width="50%" | 
 Jesus Christ Superstar Live in Concert (NBC) 60th Annual Grammy Awards (CBS)
 Last Week Tonight with John Oliver: "Episode 421" (HBO)
 The Oscars (ABC)
 The Voice: "Live Finale (Part 2)" (NBC)
|-
| style="vertical-align:top;" width="50%" colspan="2" | 
 Anthony Bourdain: Parts Unknown: "Lagos" (CNN)'''
 The Defiant Ones (HBO)
 Jane (Nat Geo)
 The Vietnam War: "Episode 6: Things Fall Apart (January 1968–July 1968)" (PBS)
 Wild Wild Country: "Part 1" (Netflix)
|}

Special Visual Effects
{| class="wikitable"
|+ 
|-
| style="vertical-align:top;" width="50%" | 
 'Game of Thrones: "Beyond the Wall" (HBO) Altered Carbon: "Out of the Past" (Netflix)
 Lost in Space: "Danger, Will Robinson" (Netflix)
 Stranger Things: "Chapter Nine: The Gate" (Netflix)
 Westworld: "The Passenger" (HBO)
| style="vertical-align:top;" width="50%" | 
 The Alienist: "The Boy on the Bridge" (TNT)' The Crown: "Misadventure" (Netflix)
 Gotham: "That's Entertainment" (Fox)
 The Handmaid's Tale: "June" (Hulu)
 Mr. Robot: "eps3.4_runtime-error.r00" (USA)
|}

Stunt Coordination
{| class="wikitable"
|+ 
|-
| style="vertical-align:top;" width="50%" | 
 'GLOW (Netflix) Brooklyn Nine-Nine (Fox)
 Cobra Kai (YouTube)
 Saturday Night Live (NBC)
 Shameless (Showtime)
| style="vertical-align:top;" width="50%" | 
 Game of Thrones (HBO)' The Blacklist (NBC)
 Blindspot (NBC)
 Marvel's The Punisher (Netflix)
 Westworld (HBO)
|}

Technical Direction
{| class="wikitable"
|+ 
|-
| style="vertical-align:top;" width="50%" | 
 'Saturday Night Live: "Host: Donald Glover" (NBC) The Big Bang Theory: "The Bow Tie Asymmetry" (CBS)
 Dancing with the Stars: "Finale" (ABC)
 Jimmy Kimmel Live!: "Jimmy Kimmel Live in Brooklyn: Billy Joel and Tracy Morgan" (ABC)
 Last Week Tonight with John Oliver: "Episode 421" (HBO)
 The Voice: "Live Finale, Part 2" (NBC)
| style="vertical-align:top;" width="50%" | 
 Jesus Christ Superstar Live in Concert (NBC)' 2018 Rock and Roll Hall of Fame Induction Ceremony (HBO)
 Carpool Karaoke Primetime Special 2018 (CBS)
 The Oscars (ABC)
 Super Bowl LI Halftime Show Starring Justin Timberlake (NBC)
|}

Writing
{| class="wikitable"
|+ 
|-
| style="vertical-align:top;" width="50%" | 
 'Anthony Bourdain: Parts Unknown: "Southern Italy" (CNN) The Defiant Ones: "Episode 1" (HBO)
 Icarus (Netflix)
 Jane (Nat Geo)
 Mister Rogers: It's You I Like (PBS)
 The Vietnam War: "Episode 8: The History of the World (April 1969–May 1970)" (PBS)
| style="vertical-align:top;" width="50%" | 
 Last Week Tonight with John Oliver (HBO)' Full Frontal with Samantha Bee (TBS)
 Late Night with Seth Meyers (NBC)
 The Late Show with Stephen Colbert (CBS)
 Saturday Night Live (NBC)
|}

Changes
In December 2017, the Television Academy announced a few minor changes to some categories.

 The categories Outstanding Special Class Program and Primetime Emmy Award for Outstanding Variety, Music, or Comedy Special were restructured and renamed, the first one as Primetime Emmy Award for Outstanding Variety Special (Live) and the second one as Primetime Emmy Award for Outstanding Variety Special (Pre-Recorded).
The category Outstanding Costumes for a Period/Fantasy Series, Limited Series, or Movie has been split into Outstanding Period Costumes and Outstanding Fantasy/Sci-Fi Costumes.
The category Outstanding Directing for Nonfiction Programming has been split as well into Outstanding Directing for a Documentary/Nonfiction Program and Outstanding Directing for a Reality Program.
The category Outstanding Sound Editing for a Series has been split as well into Outstanding Sound Editing for a Comedy or Drama Series (One-Hour) and Outstanding Sound Editing for a Comedy or Drama Series (Half-Hour) and Animation.

Wins by network

Programs with multiple awards

Most nominationsSources'':

References

6.

External links
 Academy of Television Arts and Sciences website

070 Creative Arts
2018 in American television
2018 in Los Angeles
2018 awards in the United States
2018 television awards
September 2018 events in the United States